Friedrich Karl Walter Degenhard Freiherr von Loë (9 September 1828 – 6 July 1908) was a Prussian soldier and aristocrat. Loë had the distinction of being one of the few Roman Catholics to reach the rank of Generalfeldmarschall (field marshal) in the Prussian and imperial German armies.

Biography 
Walter was born on 9 September 1828 in Schloss Allner, Hennef, to Baron Maximilian von Loë (1801–1850), a chamberlain in the Prussian royal court and chief administrator of the Sieg district in the Rhine Province, and his first wife, Countess Helene von Hatzfeldt-Werther-Schönstein (1801–1838). The House of Loë was an ancient Catholic noble family of Westphalian origin, who was raised to the status of baron of the Holy Roman Empire in 1629. Walter had two younger brothers: Engelbert (1833–1904), and Otto (1835–1892), who would later become a member of the Reichstag.

Military career 
In his youth, Loë was educated at the Ritterakademie in Bedburg until 1845, when he served his required year in the military and was transferred to the reserves. After graduating from the academy, he studied at Bonn University. Loë was not to stay at the university for long, however, as war with Denmark broke out over a border dispute known as the Schleswig-Holstein Question. The duchies of Schleswig and Holstein, located along the Danish border, were claimed by both Prussia and Denmark. When German Schleswig-Holsteiners rebelled, Prussia and other German states sent forces to intervene. Loë served as a lieutenant of German cavalry during the conflict, eventually transferring to the Prussian 3rd Hussars.

In 1851, the war with Denmark concluded with an agreement, the 1852 London Protocol, which allowed the Danes to retain Schleswig-Holstein. Loë remained in the military, however, fighting rebels in Baden before becoming adjutant of Prussia's Army Riding School. A major by 1861, Loë became an aide-de-camp to King William I of Prussia, serving in this capacity for one year, upon which he accompanied the King's brother, Prince Albert, to the Caucasus. In 1863, Loë was appointed military attaché to the French army in Algeria; whilst in North Africa, he participated in a French campaign against Arab rebels.

Returning to Prussia, Loë was transferred to the army's Grand Headquarters, seeing action in the Battle of Königgrätz. He was promoted firstly to lieutenant colonel (1867) and then to full colonel (1868), and commanded the Seventh Hussars during the Franco-Prussian War, after which Germany was unified under William, now Emperor of the entire German nation. Loë's forces performed satisfactorily during the war, and he advanced to the level of brigade commander. Serving in both command and staff roles, Loë—having succeeded to his father's title of baron—rose to major general and then to lieutenant general. He became the commander of the 5th Division in 1879, and served from 1880 to 1884 as Prussian adjutant general, after which he was given command of the VIII Army Corps.

In February of 1893, Loë was sent to Rome as Germany's liaison to the Holy See, meeting with Pope Leo XIII. Upon his successful completion of this diplomatic mission, Loë was made colonel general of the cavalry. After spending two years in charge of the cavalry branch, he was promoted to field marshal on 1 January 1905, becoming one of the few Catholics to receive this highest rank after service in the Protestant-dominated Prussian army. Additionally, Loë was made Commander-in-chief of the Marches and Governor of Berlin.

Later life 
In 1897, the field marshal retired from military service due to ill health, although he retained his positions as adjutant general and emissary. He was further appointed a member of the Prussian House of Lords for life in 1900, after completing another diplomatic mission. He died on 6 July 1908 of complications from a lung catarrh in Bonn.

Marriage and issue 
On 24 May 1859, Loë married his distant cousin Countess Franziska von Nimptsch, née Hatzfeldt zu Trachenberg (1833–1922), who had three children of her own from a previous marriage. The couple had three children: Helene (1860–1902), and twins Margarethe (1866-1943) and Hubert (1866).

Catholic faith 
Loë's promotion to field marshal was exceptional in that this honour was rarely given to Catholics. Traditionally a Protestant state, Prussia allowed few Catholics to rise that high in rank. Despite his beliefs, Loë supported practices such as dueling, often embracing the traditions of Prussian Protestant officers.

Loë's faith, as well as his connection to the House of Hatzfeldt, would also bring him into conflict with Imperial Chancellor Otto von Bismarck, who spearheaded the anti-Catholic Kulturkampf during the 1870s. Bismarck was among those involved in the affair between his son Herbert and Princess Elisabeth von Carolath-Beuthen, the latter of whom was Loë's sister-in-law.

Honours and awards 
 The Loestraße in Südstadt, Bonn, is named in his honour.

Orders and decorations

Military appointments 
 À la suite of the 7th (1st Rhenish) Hussars "King William I"

Honorary citizenships and doctorates 
 Honorary Citizen of the City of Bonn, 1897
 Honorary Doctorate from the Rheinische Friedrich-Wilhelms University, 8 July 1908

Notes

References

Bibliography

External links 
 Profile at WWU Münster

1828 births
1908 deaths
People from Hennef (Sieg)
People from the Rhine Province
German Roman Catholics
Members of the Prussian House of Lords
Field marshals of the German Empire
Field marshals of Prussia
Westphalian nobility
People of the Revolutions of 1848
Prussian people of the Austro-Prussian War
German military personnel of the Franco-Prussian War
Recipients of the Iron Cross (1870), 1st class
Recipients of the Iron Cross (1870), 2nd class
Grand Crosses of the Order of Saint Stephen of Hungary
Grand Crosses of the Order of Franz Joseph
Grand Crosses of the Military Merit Order (Bavaria)
Grand Officiers of the Légion d'honneur
Recipients of the Order of the Crown (Italy)
Recipients of the Order of the Netherlands Lion
Recipients of the Order of St. Vladimir, 4th class
Recipients of the Order of St. Anna, 1st class
Recipients of the Order of St. Anna, 2nd class
Commanders Grand Cross of the Order of the Sword
Military personnel from North Rhine-Westphalia